Tonga competed at the 2020 Summer Olympics in Tokyo. Originally scheduled to take place from 24 July to 9 August 2020, the Games were postponed to 23 July to 8 August 2021, due to the COVID-19 pandemic. It was the nation's tenth consecutive appearance at the Summer Olympics.

Competitors
The following is the list of number of competitors in the Games.

Athletics

Tonga received a universality slot from the World Athletics to send a male track and field athlete to the Olympics.

Track & road events

Swimming 

Tonga received a universality invitation from FINA to send two top-ranked swimmers (one per gender) in their respective individual events to the Olympics, based on the FINA Points System of June 28, 2021.

Taekwondo

Tonga entered two athletes into the taekwondo competition at the Games. Rio 2016 Olympian Pita Taufatofua (men's +80 kg) and Malia Paseka (women's 67 kg) secured spots with a victory each in their respective weight classes at the 2020 Oceania Qualification Tournament in Gold Coast, Queensland, Australia.

Weightlifting

Tonga received one tripartite invitation quota from the International Weightlifting Federation.

References 

Olympics
Nations at the 2020 Summer Olympics
2020